Vladislav Vladimirovich Zhovnirski (born 12 July 1978) is a Russian pair skating coach and former competitor. With Victoria Maxiuta, he is the 1996 World Junior champion, 1997 Ondrej Nepela Memorial champion, 1998 Skate America bronze medalist, and 1999 Winter Universiade champion.

Personal life 
Zhovnirski was born 12 July 1978 in Kiev, Ukrainian SSR, Soviet Union. He lives in Moscow, Russia. He is married to Russian former pair skater Arina Ushakova, with whom he has a child (born  2016).

Career

Partnership with Maxiuta 
Zhovnirski competed for Russia and began appearing internationally with Victoria Maxiuta in 1993. They were awarded gold at the 1996 World Junior Championships, held from November to December 1995 in Brisbane, Australia.

The pair's first senior international medal, gold, came at the Ondrej Nepela Memorial in September 1996. Maxiuta/Zhovnirski went on to take bronze at the 1997 World Junior Championships, held in November 1996 in Seoul, South Korea; bronze at the 1998 World Junior Championships in December 1997 in Saint John, New Brunswick, Canada; and silver at the 1997–98 Junior Series Final in March 1998 in Lausanne, Switzerland.

Maxiuta/Zhovnirski began the 1998–99 season with gold medals at both of their Junior Grand Prix assignments – in Sofia, Bulgaria, and Chemnitz, Germany – before winning bronze at a senior Grand Prix event, the 1998 Skate America. In November 1998, the pair stepped onto the World Junior Championship podium for the fourth consecutive year, taking bronze in Zagreb, Croatia. In January 1999, they outscored Pang Qing / Tong Jian for gold at the Winter Universiade in Žilina, Slovakia. In March, they took bronze at the Junior Grand Prix Final in Detroit. The pair was coached by Nina Mozer.

Later career 
From 2001 to 2003, Zhovnirski competed with Elena Ivanovich (also known as Jelena Jovanović) but finished no higher than 8th at the Russian Championships.

Following the end of his competitive career, he began working as a pairs coach in collaboration with Nina Mozer in Moscow. His students include 2012 JGP Final champions Lina Fedorova / Maxim Miroshkin and Ksenia Stolbova / Fedor Klimov (from mid-2013).

Competitive highlights 
GP: Grand Prix; JGP: Junior Grand Prix

With Ivanovich

With Maxiuta

References

Navigation

Russian male pair skaters
Sportspeople from Kyiv
Figure skaters from Moscow
1978 births
Ukrainian emigrants to Russia
Living people
World Junior Figure Skating Championships medalists
Universiade medalists in figure skating
Universiade gold medalists for Russia
Competitors at the 1999 Winter Universiade